Van Nuys Blvd. is a 1979 comedy film written and directed by William Sachs and released by Crown International Pictures.  It features 1974 Playboy Playmate of the Year Cynthia Wood. The film's tag line is: "The Greatest Cruisin' in the Land Takes Place on the Street -- Where it all Began ..."

Plot

The film tells the story of a small-town boy, Bobby, who hears about the wild nights of cruising Van Nuys Boulevard in California. He drives out there to check it out, and gets involved with drag racers, topless dancers and bikers.

After some establishing scenes in which two men destroy each other's cars, Greg hooks up with a female biker, "Chooch" is arrested for running a red light after being mooned, and Bobby and Moon are arrested for drag racing, the main characters meet in jail and make plans to go to an amusement park. Chooch gets sick, but Bobby learns to dance and Greg and his dream girl Camille hit it off. Wanda, after hooking up with Bobby in his van, resists the attentions of police officer "Zass," and escapes by handcuffing him to his police car. After a visit to the doctor after Greg gets lockjaw, Chooch meets Wanda and they play air hockey. After everyone is paired off, Chooch admits his name is "Leon" and he and Wanda decide to leave and get married, and Greg and Camille are a couple, but Bobby stills needs to prove his manhood by beating Moon in a drag race in their respective vans. He wins, but Moon leaves him because he loves his van instead of her. To prove he loves her more, Bobby jumps clear as his van goes over a cliff. Moon, confused by his crazy behavior, drives off, but comes back and hugs Bobby as Greg, Camille, Leon, and Wanda circle them in cars.

Because director William Sachs' style is often rather absurdist, a number of comedic scenes in the B plot of police officer Zass on the beach, being handcuffed to his car, show a gradually more and more absurd tone as the film progresses. In the course of the film, he gets approached by a mysterious biker stealing his possessions, a dog and ultimately, towards the end of the film, his own mother who is worried about her boy while police searches for his location. The film ends with Zass buying Leon's car and getting harassed by another police officer himself for driving on Van Nuys Boulevard.

Cast
The cast includes:
 Bill Adler as Bobby
 Cynthia Wood as Moon
 Dennis Bowen as Greg
 Melissa Prophet as Camille
 David Hayward as Leon Barnes "Chooch"
 Tara Strohmeier as Wanda
 The Kansas City Kings Glitter Girls

Production
The time between the initial ideas for the film and its release was merely three months. It was filmed in eighteen days. For the scene in which two cars are smashed, the director originally wanted the cars to be wrecked completely, with doors flying off and other parts being destroyed. He jokingly recalls that while filming, they discovered that modern cars were better built than expected, so the damage done with hammers and other tools turned out to be not as severe as originally planned.

Reception
Some reviewers have been supportive and the film has acquired cult film status.

References

External links
 

1979 films
1979 comedy films
American independent films
American auto racing films
American coming-of-age films
American teen comedy films
Films shot in Los Angeles
Kustom Kulture
Crown International Pictures films
Vansploitation films
1970s English-language films
Films directed by William Sachs
1970s American films